The Mathare Football for Hope Centre is located on Kangundo Road, in Komarock, Nairobi. Mathare's Football for Hope host organization is MYSA, Mathare Youth Sports Association.

Description
The project's start date was 15 August 2008 and cost approximately US$120,000 at its conclusion. The physical structure is sized at 200 sq. meters and includes a Youth Centre, Stadium/Sports Facility, Health Clinic, and a Community Centre. The site's capacity is capped at 200. The centre's beneficiaries include at-risk children from ages ten to eighteen years of age, and will be accessed by approximately 50,000 people of the greater Mathare community and surrounding areas.

The Mathare Football for Hope Centre was made possible by “20 Centres for 2010,” the Official Campaign of the 2010 FIFA World Cup South Africa. The entire campaign aims to address local social challenges in disadvantaged areas and improve education and health services for young people through the creation of these centers. Each center throughout Africa has its own local Centre Host Organization.

Host Organization 
MYSA, the centre's host organization, is located in Mathare, a collection of slums in Nairobi, Kenya. The organization is run by young people, aiding in their development in its fullest potential, and was founded with the intent to enhance their social proficiencies through the teaching of football.

The mission of MYSA is, “Linking Sports, Community Leadership and Sustainable Development in Africa by: Creating opportunities for physical, personal and community development; Empowering young people and building their self-esteem; Empowering young people to become responsible citizens and environmental preservation experts.”

The association has been in existence since 1987, celebrating its twentieth anniversary in 2006. The organization has expanded to a staff of sixty members, and over 7,000 volunteers. In addition, the association is making notable strides in helping their local youth become responsible citizens.

MYSA has been awarded the UN Environment Programme 500 Award, Common Ground Award 2010, Winners Beyond Sport Award – Leadership in sport Award Category 2011, and was nominated for the Nobel Peace Prize twice.

Design 
As noted in MYSA's mission statement, one of the association's goals is to develop their youth into environmental preservation experts (cite mission). The Mathare Football for Hope Centre chose to work with Studio 610 to design the space. They stated that their goal was, “to provide a space that is functional, sustainable, cost effective, and that will become a beacon where the community can come together.”

The main building within the structure is formed by local stone masonry. The stone in the design was kept its natural colour in order to symbolize the nature of Kenya. In turn, the interior walls are painted bright colours in order to symbolize the heart and vibrancy of the Kenyan culture. The intent of the colourful interior was for the colour to radiate through the large glass like a multicoloured lantern. In addition, the flat roof allows for the installation of solar panels and easy rainwater collection.

The architects of record for this project were Andrew Gremley and Pharos Architects.

In order to incorporate the association's sustainability goals, Studio 610 included the following sustainability initiatives in their design of the centre: the buildings consists of stones hand cut from the local quarries of Nairobi; it is powered by low cost devices such as low energy light bulbs; has block pavers that allow for proper drainage of rainwater into the ground; consists of a rain water collection design in which the water is directed to a harvesting tank and/or the irrigation system; high degree natural ventilation system so as to avoid the use of air conditioning; a natural cooling system with a shading structure at the northern end of the building that will create air circulation for cooling the seating/step and plaza area; large glazed openings to allow for the maximum use of daylight to ensure low use of artificial light; the shipping containers used to transport the turf have been recycled and reused as the tower element, and have been modified and incorporated alongside the field as an open shaded structure for gathering and storage; low construct waste in which the contractor was committed to separating on site waste and recycling; the building is positioned strategically to ensure optimal daylight at all times as well as shading to prevent overheating; and the fields have been dressed with artificial turf in order to lower maintenance costs, save water, and is completely recyclable.

The environmental consultant for this project was Dr. Alfred Omenya

Development 
As of July 2012, approximately 150 kids are accessing the centre each week; 200 girls have been recruited for the centre's football league; six youth have been trained as HIV testing and counselling counsellors; 579 Males and 478 Females have been counselled and tested on HIV/AIDS; 120 boys and 108 girls have been recruited to the library program; and 59 youth have been trained on entrepreneurship and basic computer training.

References 

Football in Kenya
Sports venues in Kenya
Non-profit organisations based in Kenya